Vestas aircoil A/S is a manufacturer of charge air coolers, intercoolers and cooling towers founded in the small Danish town of Lem in Jutland. Vestas built the first marine diesel engine charge air cooler for Burmeister & Wain in 1956. Since the turn of the century, Vestas aircoil has opened locations in the Far East and Southern Europe and continues to be a major supplier to engine builders and operators all over the world.

Until the 1980s, the company was associated with Vestas Wind Systems who are located in the same town

They continue to manufacture charge air coolers for new and existing diesel engines; and in recent years have seen significant growth despite severe competition from the Far East.

Gallery

Manufacturing companies of Denmark
Danish companies established in 1956